Two-Face is a supervillain appearing in comic books published by DC Comics, commonly as an adversary of the superhero Batman. The character was created by Bob Kane and first appeared in Detective Comics #66 (August 1942). As one of Batman's most enduring enemies, Two-Face belongs to the collective of adversaries that make up Batman's rogues gallery.

Once a bright and upstanding district attorney of Gotham City dedicated to ridding its streets of crime and corruption, Harvey Dent is hideously scarred on the left side of his face after mob boss Sal Maroni throws acidic chemicals at him during a court trial. He subsequently goes insane and adopts the "Two-Face" persona, becoming a criminal obsessed with the number two, the concept of duality, and the conflict between good and evil. Two-Face obsessively makes all important decisions by flipping a two-headed coin, with the other half scarred. The character was reinvented for the Modern Age of Comic Books as having dissociative identity disorder, with Two-Face being an alter, which stemmed from the abuse Harvey received from his father during his childhood. The modern version is established as having once been a personal friend and ally of James Gordon and Batman, as well as the childhood best friend of Batman's secret identity, Bruce Wayne.

Two-Face has no superpowers, instead relying on his proficiency in marksmanship and martial arts, which was further improved after being trained by Deathstroke and Batman. As a former lawyer, the character uses his expertise in criminal law, criminology, and police procedures to devise his crimes.

The character has been adapted into numerous forms of media, having been portrayed in live action by Billy Dee Williams in the 1989 film Batman, Tommy Lee Jones in the 1995 film Batman Forever, Aaron Eckhart in 2008 film The Dark Knight, Nicholas D'Agosto on the FOX television series Gotham, and Misha Collins on The CW television series Gotham Knights. Richard Moll, Troy Baker, and others have provided Two-Face's voice ranging from animation to video games.
In 2009, Two-Face was ranked as IGN's 12th-greatest comic book villain of all time.

Publication history

Creation and Golden Age history

Two-Face was created by Batman co-creator Bob Kane, and debuted in Detective Comics #66 ("The Crimes of Two-Face"), written by Batman's other co-creator Bill Finger, in August 1942 as a new Batman villain originally named Harvey "Apollo" Kent, a former handsome, law-abiding Gotham City district attorney close to the Batman whose face was disfigured in half after a mob boss he was prosecuting, Sal Maroni, splashed Kent with acid, resulting in his loss of sanity and turn to crime, with his crimes centered around the number 2.  In creating Two-Face, Kane was inspired by the 1931 adaptation of the Robert Louis Stevenson story The Strange Case of Dr. Jekyll and Mr. Hyde, which Kane described as a "classic story of the good and evil sides of human nature", and was also influenced by the 1925 silent film adaptation of Gaston Leroux's novel The Phantom of the Opera. Kane and Finger conceived the idea of Two-Face flipping a coin scarred on one side to determine which side of his personality emerges: evil if the coin flip results in the scarred side, which causes him to "go on a rampage of looting and destruction," or good if it results in the unscarred side, causing him to give his loot to charity or refrain from committing a crime. In Kane's autobiography Batman and Me, Kane suggests that Finger was inspired by the pulp magazine hero Black Bat, with their similarities as both district attorneys disfigured with acid. Two-Face's last name Kent was later changed to Dent, which Kane infers was done because of Superman's alter ego Clark Kent having the same surname.

"The Crimes of Two-Face" also introduced Two-Face's devoted wife, Gilda Dent, a long-standing character in Two-Face stories. Later appearances continued featuring the character's criminal life until he was cured through plastic surgery in his third appearance and shown reformed in 1952's "The Double Crimes of Two-Face!" (Detective Comics #187), with impostors taking Two-Face's place in later stories. Two-Face made his last appearance in the Golden Age of Comic Books in 1954's "Two-Face Strikes Again" (Batman #81), in which Two-Face returns to crime; however, this story is non-canon to the Golden Age version of the character, because only the Two-Face stories from 1942 to 1952 were assigned to DC's setting for their Golden Age characters, Earth-Two.

Dormancy and revitalization
The character was unused throughout the Silver Age of Comic Books, only appearing in the 173rd issue of World's Finest Comics in 1968 which featured Batman transforming into Two-Face. In July 1971, during the Bronze Age of Comic Books, Two-Face was brought back by writer Dennis O'Neil and former DC editor Julius Schwartz in the story "Half an Evil" (Batman #234). Written by O'Neil and drawn by Neal Adams, "Half an Evil" is a mystery story which features Two-Face stealing doubloons from a pirate ship; the issue also retold his origin with a recap of previous stories. After his reintroduction, Two-Face was featured in several DC comics, such as The Brave and The Bold, Justice League of America, and Teen Titans, and became one of Batman's most popular enemies.

Modern Age

Following the Crisis on Infinite Earths comic event which rebooted the DC Universe, Two-Face was reintroduced in Frank Miller's 1986 revision of Batman's origin, Batman: Year One, as Gotham City's former crusader against crime and former ally of the Batman. Later in 1990, Two-Face was given a revised origin by Andrew Helfer in 1990's "The Eye of the Beholder" (Batman Annual #14) which established Harvey Dent as having dissociative identity disorder effected by the psychological trauma from his past of childhood abuse dealt by his father, with Two-Face being a second personality state, and cemented Dent as being formerly part of an alliance with Batman and Commissioner James Gordon against crime in Gotham City. 1995's Batman/Two-Face: Crime and Punishment by writer J.M. DeMatteis and artist Scott McDaniel built on "Eye of the Beholder" and explored Dent's psyche and his childhood with his abusive father. Two-Face's origin was later expanded in writer Jeph Loeb and artist Tim Sale's 1996 Batman limited series The Long Halloween, which incorporated aspects of "Eye of the Beholder" and explored Batman, Gordon and Dent's struggle to end Gotham's Mob during the rise of costumed supervillains.

A reformed Dent rid of Two-Face was featured in Loeb and artist Jim Lee's 2002 Batman arc Hush, continuing on to 2006 in the 52 limited series and in writer James Robinson's Batman arc "Face the Face", which explored Dent having trained under Batman and taking Batman's place as Gotham's protector during Batman's one-year absence, as well as Two-Face's return. In the 2006 limited series Two-Face: Year One written by Mark Sable, Two-Face was given a revamped origin, focusing on Dent's transformation into Two-Face during Dent's election campaign for district attorney, as well as establishing the relationship between a young Harvey Dent and Bruce Wayne, Batman's secret identity.

Following DC's New 52 reboot in 2011, Two-Face's origin was changed by writer Peter J. Tomasi in the 2014 Batman and Robin arc The Big Burn, altering the cause of Dent's transformation into Two-Face and introducing Gilda Dent's death into his origin; the story also established Dent's knowledge of Bruce Wayne being Batman, and concluded with Dent dying by suicide. The subsequent DC Rebirth 2016 soft reboot reintroduced Two-Face in Scott Snyder's My Own Worst Enemy arc in All-Star Batman, in which Batman tries to obtain a cure to rid Dent of Two-Face in a road trip. Two-Face was then featured in the 2020 Detective Comics arc Ugly Heart, which showed Dent surviving his suicide attempt in Tomasi's previous story "The Big Burn" then starting a cult named the Church of Two, before being rid of Two-Face through brain surgery conducted by Batman. Dent is shown reformed throughout comics such as Matthew Rosenberg's 2021 limited series Task Force Z and Detective Comics.

Characterization

Description
Two-Face is a duality-obsessed criminal. Introduced in 1942 as a criminal mastermind obsessed with the number 2, Two-Face's crimes as well as his hideouts and henchmen surround the number; since the 1980s, Two-Face's duality obsession evolved into an obsession with the duality of man, with the character committing crimes based on his "misguided sense of right and wrong".

Two-Face views himself as both good and evil, and relies on flipping his double-headed coin, scarred on one side, in making important decisions and deciding whether his good or evil side will prevail.

Widely considered Batman's most tragic villain, Two-Face was established as a tragic figure in his debut: a former law-abiding district attorney turned criminal whose disfigurement resulted in him being shunned by society, which lead to his turn to crime. In his early stories, Two-Face yearns to fix his face and bring back the love of his wife who he mistakenly thinks does not love him because of his disfigurement. 1990's "The Eye of the Beholder" (Batman Annual #14) reimagined Two-Face for the Modern Age as having psychological trauma from the childhood abuse he received from his father, and depicted him as being on the verge of a mental breakdown as a result of his repressed trauma and the pressure of fighting crime in Gotham, and driven to a point of desperation by Gotham's corruption. "Eye of the Beholder" also established Two-Face as a second personality state of Harvey Dent's dissociative identity disorder which resulted from his trauma; a psychiatrist in the story describes his condition as having "two personalities", with Dent having managed to "sublimate the second, anti-social one since he was a teenager".

Skills and abilities
Before his transformation into Two-Face, Harvey Dent had a successful career as Gotham's district attorney, driven to bring an end to the city's epidemic of organized crime. Following his disfigurement, he becomes obsessed with the number two and the concept of duality, and thus stages crimes centered around the number two—such as robbing buildings with 2 in the address or staging events that will take place at 10:22 p.m. (2222 in military time). He was an accomplished lawyer highly skilled in almost all matters relating to criminal law and an extensive knowledge of the criminal world. He is also a charismatic leader and speaker. Two-Face is a genius in criminal planning and has an exceptional character, which allows him, among other things, to stoically endure pain and recover from smudging injuries in a short time. Two-Face is a skilled marksman, and regularly uses a variety of firearms such as pistols, shotguns, grenade launchers, Tommy guns, knives and rocket launchers during his battles with Batman. He primarily wields dual pistols, and has become dangerously skilled with them.

Harvey Dent has received combat training from Batman and Deathstroke. The Batman: Face the Face story arc reveals that Batman, shortly before leaving Gotham for a year, trains Dent extensively in detective work and martial arts. To further improve his proficiency in the use of firearms, Dent hires the sharpshooting assassin Deathstroke to train him.

Relationships
This section details the character's most notable relationships across various interpretations of the Batman mythos:

Gilda Dent
Gilda Dent is Harvey Dent's wife. Her character debuted in Detective Comics #66, alongside Harvey, and became a recurring character in Batman stories involving Two-Face.

Bruce Wayne
Batman's alter-ego Bruce Wayne is the best friend of Harvey Dent, while before becoming Two-Face, Harvey was also one of Batman's earliest allies, predating Batman's partnership with James Gordon. Their friendship goes back to Harvey's first appearance in Detective Comics, in which Batman refers to him as his friend and emotionally asks him to give up his life of crime. Because of this relationship, Two-Face is one of Batman's most personal enemies. In the comics, it is shown that Bruce considers Harvey's downfall a personal failure, and has never given up in rehabilitating him.

It is established canonically that Harvey knows Bruce Wayne is Batman. The character's knowledge of Batman's secret identity was introduced in the story The Big Burn from Peter Tomasi's 2011 Batman and Robin ongoing series, and is shown in subsequent comics such as Scott Snyder's All-Star Batman, in which they were established as childhood best friends. In Detective Comics #1021, Harvey admits to Batman that he has been keeping his identity secret from his Two-Face personality in order to protect him.

Renee Montoya
Renee Montoya and Harvey Dent have a complicated relationship, introduced by writer Greg Rucka in the sixteenth issue of 1999's Batman Chronicles, in which Renee reaches out to Two-Face's Dent persona and is kind to him. Their relationship continues with the "No Man's Land" crossover storyline; in one issue, Harvey sends Renee flowers for her birthday and Renee visits him in Arkham Asylum. Harvey eventually develops romantic feelings towards Renee, which Renee doesn't return. This one-sided love would turn into an unhealthy obsession with her, which would lead to her professional and personal ruin; in the five-part Gotham Central story arc Half A Life, Two-Face attempts to destroy Renee's life by framing her for murder, outing her as a lesbian, and orchestrating a prison escape to make her a fugitive, so she would have nothing to keep her from returning his love.

Years after the release of Half a Life, Rucka would reunite the two in Convergence: The Question in 2015, following his return to DC Comics after his departure from the company in 2010. In the story, Renee saves a remorseful Harvey from killing himself, and convinces him to be a good man.

Rucka has talked about the characters' relationship in an interview with Comic Book:

Christopher Dent
Christopher Dent is Harvey Dent's abusive and alcoholic father, first introduced in the definitive Two-Face origin story Eye of the Beholder (Batman Annual #14). The trauma Harvey received from his father's constant abuse fueled the inner torment that eventually turns him into Two-Face.

Character biography

Golden Age

Two-Face's debut and Golden Age origin story, 1942's "The Crimes of Two-Face" (Detective Comics #66), introduced him as Harvey "Apollo" Kent, a handsome law-abiding Gotham City district attorney prosecuting mob boss Sal Maroni; the issue also introduced his wife, Gilda Kent, who is a sculptress. During the trial, after Kent presents Maroni's lucky two-headed coin as evidence, Maroni throws acid at Kent's face and disfigures it in half. Kent, driven insane by society's repulsion and his wife's nonacceptance of his new appearance, destroys his wife's sculpture of him to resemble his disfigurement and scars one side of Maroni's two-headed coin to symbolize his appearance's duality of beauty and ugliness, then flips the coin to decide whether to become a criminal or wait for the only plastic surgeon able to fix Kent's face, who was caught in a concentration camp in Germany, to arrive. With the scarred side of the coin being the result of Kent's coin flip, Kent decides to become a criminal with the alias Two-Face who depends on flipping his coin to determine whether to be evil or good; afterwards, with the coin landing on the scarred side, Two-Face robs a bank, then, with the coin landing on the unscarred side, gives his loot to charity, causing confusion between the police and populace, whose opinions are divided about Two-Face's morality. The rest of the issue features Two-Face committing a series of crimes centered on the number 2, one of which is stopped by Batman, who pursues and corners Two-Face after he escapes. Batman makes Two-Face a proposition to give himself up and start over, by which Two-Face replies that the coin makes all his decisions for him, then flips the coin. The issue ends with the coin landing on its edge, making Two-Face leave his life to fate, with the story being resolved in "The Man Who Led a Double Life!" (Detective Comics #68). Harvey Kent is cured through plastic surgery in 1943's "The End of Two-Face" (Detective Comics #80), and is shown reformed in 1952's "The Double Crimes of Two-Face!" (Detective Comics #187). Later, Kent attends the wedding of Bruce Wayne and Selina Kyle as a guest in 1981's "The Kill Kent Contract!" (Superman Family #211).

Bronze Age

In Two-Face's Bronze Age reintroduction, "Half a Life" (Batman #234), Two-Face concocts an elaborate scheme to steal doubloons from a historical schooner, which Batman realizes and attempts to stop. As Batman approaches the ship, Two-Face finds and incapacitates him, then ties him up, eventually leaving the ship  after he lets it sink. Before Two-Face leaves, Batman tries to convince Two-Face to flip his coin to save an old man unwittingly caught in the trap by reminding him that he is both good and evil; Two-Face first disagrees until after his departure from the ship in which he is unable to resist flipping his coin. With the coin landing on the unscarred side, Two-Face returns to the ship to rescue the old man, then sees Batman had escaped his restraints. Batman offers Two-Face to surrender, to which Two-Face disagrees and attempts to attack Batman, with Two-Face being knocked out unconscious by Batman afterwards. "Half a Life" also includes a recap of his Golden Age stories as his origin: from his transformation to Two-Face and his subsequent reformation to his criminal relapse, as depicted in the 1954 story "Two-Face Strikes Again!" (Batman #81), in which Harvey Dent's plastic surgery is undone after he attempts to prevent a robbery, causing his return as Two-Face.

In "Threat of the Two-Headed Coin!" (Batman #258), Two-Face is broken out of Arkham Hospital by a retired United States Army general who hires Two-Face to blackmail the United States government with an atomic bomb. After Two-Face betrays the general and takes over his plan, the general reveals the scheme to Batman, then dies by suicide out of remorse. Later, in the United States Capitol, Two-Face interrupts a Congress meeting to carry out the extortion scheme: in exchange for not exploding the Capitol with an atomic bomb, Two-Face demands the United States government to give him two billion dollars and gemstones, with Two-Face intending to use the money to bribe people to ignore his hideous appearance and end his misery; Batman eventually foils Two-Face's plan.

Two-Face then appears in a number of non-Batman comics, such as The Joker, Justice League of America, and Teen Titans. The Joker's first issue, "The Joker's Double Jeopardy", features Two-Face and fellow Batman adversary Joker battling each other to prove who is the superior criminal, while Justice League of America's 125-26th issues, "The Men Who Sold Destruction!" and "The Evil Connection", shows Two-Face assisting the superhero team Justice League. In Teen Titans, Two-Face meets Teen Titans member Duela Dent who claims to be his daughter.

In the 313-314th issues of Batman, Two-Face steals a top secret missile activation binary code owned by the United States government and goes to New Orleans, with Batman and a United States federal agent reluctantly working together to trail him and obtain the code. On a float in New Orleans' Mardi Gras parade, Two-Face deceives an American and a Russian representative who each negotiated for the code for $22,000,000 and steals $44,000,000 from them; Two-Face then escapes from the float to a blimp, with Batman and the agent in pursuit. Afterwards, while Batman hangs from the blimp's hatch, Two-Face flips the coin to decide whether to kill him, with the agent eventually shooting the coin outwards the hatch. Two-Face, declaring that his life is meaningless without the coin, leaps for it and falls out of the blimp.

Two-Face changes his face through plastic surgery as well as his identity to Carl Ternion in Batman's 328-329th issues, and reunites with Gilda Dent to make her happy after her former husband, Dave Stevens, died. Two-Face then avenges Stevens' death by killing Sal Maroni, who had also changed his face and his identity to Anton Karoselle and had killed Gilda Dent's former husband. Karoselle's death and Two-Face and Maroni's changed identities are significant aspects of the mystery Batman solves in the story: how Ternion murdered Karoselle twice and had been acquitted for it, as Ternion admits in a video tape sent to Batman by Two-Face. Later, Two-Face runs away from Gilda Dent after his plastic surgery becomes undone, and afterwards, Batman tells Gilda Dent the truth about Ternion's actual identity and convinces her of a plan to lure and take down Two-Face: Batman disguises himself as Maroni attacking Gilda Dent as bait, and, with Two-Face chasing him, leads Two-Face to the Gotham City courthouse, where Batman and Gilda Dent eventually convince Two-Face to rehabilitate himself in Arkham.

In the two-issue arc "Half a Hero... Is Better Than None!" from Batman #346 and Detective Comics #513, Two-Face escapes Arkham Asylum and puts Batman in an elaborate deathtrap set in a converted halfway house, eventually capturing Batman and imprisoning him for a week, after which Two-Face attempts to rob a record company named Duo Records, and is stopped by Batman's sidekick, Robin. Two-Face, having escaped the encounter, returns to the halfway house. Afterwards, Batman escapes by creating and putting on a Two-Face mask, causing Two-Face to release him.

Two-Face's good and evil sides are in conflict in a four-issue storyline in Batman and Detective Comics, with his evil side being predominant. Two-Face allies with Batman villain Black Mask's former lover Circe who convinces him to steal a pharaoh's death mask concealed within a sarcophagus which she states to be imbued with magic that could restore his good side; this plan is revealed to be conceived by Batman, who is working with Circe to trick Two-Face into having his good side restored and have him rehabilitated. The plan doesn't work with Two-Face's evil side taking over.

Modern Age

The Post-Crisis version of Two-Face is depicted as having had an unhappy childhood; his father was a mentally ill alcoholic who beat him regularly, often deciding whether or not to brutalize his son based on a flip of his lucky coin. The abuse instilled in Dent his lifelong struggle with free will and his eventual inability to make choices on his own, relying on the coin to make all of his decisions. Dent is diagnosed with dissociative identity disorder at a young age, but manages to hide his illnesses and, thanks to an unyielding work ethic, rises up through the ranks of Gotham City's district attorney's office until, at age 26, he becomes the youngest DA in the city's history. Gordon even suspected that Dent could be Batman, but discarded this suspicion when he realized that Dent lacked the vigilante's financial resources. Dent forges an alliance with Gordon and Batman to rid Gotham of organized crime. Mob boss Carmine Falcone bribes corrupt Assistant District Attorney Vernon Fields to provide his lieutenant Sal Maroni, whom Dent is trying for murder, with sulfuric acid; Maroni throws the acid in Dent's face during a cross-examination, horribly scarring the left side of Dent's face. Dent escapes from the hospital and reinvents himself as the gangster Two-Face. He scars one side of his father's coin and uses it to decide whether to commit a crime. Eventually, Two-Face takes his revenge on Falcone, Fields and Maroni, but is captured by Batman, leading to his incarceration in Arkham Asylum.

During the Batman: Dark Victory story arc, the serial killer Hangman targets various cops who assisted in Dent's rise to the D.A.'s office. Two-Face gathers Gotham's criminals to assist in the destruction of the city's crime lords. After a climactic struggle in the Batcave, Two-Face is betrayed by the Joker, who shoots at Dent, causing him to fall into a chasm, presumably to his death. Batman admits in the aftermath that, even if Two-Face has survived, Harvey Dent is gone forever. During a much later period, Two-Face is revealed to have murdered the father of Jason Todd, the second Robin. When attempting to apprehend Two-Face, Jason briefly has the criminal at his mercy, but lets Two-Face's punishment be decided by the law. Two-Face similarly serves as a 'baptism by fire' for Tim Drake, the third Robin. Two-Face has Batman at his mercy, but Tim dons the Robin suit to save Batman.

In Arkham Asylum: A Serious House on Serious Earth, Arkham's doctors replace Dent's coin with a die and eventually a tarot deck, but rather than becoming self-reliant, Dent is now unable to make even the smallest of decisions—such as going to the bathroom. Batman returns the coin, telling Two-Face to use it to decide whether to kill him. Batman leaves safely, but it is implied that Two-Face made his own decision to let Batman live.

In the No Man's Land storyline, in which Gotham is devastated by an earthquake, Two-Face claims a portion of the ruined city, takes up residence in Gotham City Hall, and forms a temporary alliance with Gordon to share certain territory. His empire is brought down by Bane (employed by Lex Luthor), who destroys Two-Face's gang during his destruction of the city's Hall of Records. Two-Face kidnaps Gordon and puts him on trial for his activities after Gotham City is declared a "No Man's Land", with Two-Face as both judge and prosecutor for Gordon's illegal alliance with him; Gordon later plays upon Two-Face's split psyche to demand Harvey Dent as his defense attorney. Dent cross-examines Two-Face and wins an acquittal for Gordon, determining that Two-Face has effectively blackmailed Gordon by implying that he had committed murders to aid the Commissioner. During this time, Two-Face also meets detective Renee Montoya. Montoya reaches the Dent persona in Two-Face and is kind to him. He falls in love with her, though the romance is one-sided.

Eventually in the Gotham Central series, he outs her as a lesbian and frames her for murder, hoping that if he takes everything from her, she will be left with no choice but to be with him. She is furious, and the two fight for control of his gun until Batman intervenes, putting Two-Face back in Arkham.

In the Batman: Two-Face - Crime and Punishment one-shot comic book, Two-Face captures his own father, planning to humiliate and kill him on live television for the years of abuse that he suffered. This story reveals that, despite his apparent hatred for his father, Dent still supports him, paying for an expensive home rather than allowing him to live in a slum. At the end of the book, the Dent and Two-Face personalities argue in thought, Two-Face calling Dent "spineless". Dent proves Two-Face wrong, choosing to jump off a building and commit suicide just to put a stop to his alter ego's crime spree. Two-Face is surprised when the coin flip comes up scarred but abides by the decision and jumps. Batman catches him, but the shock of the fall seems to (at least temporarily) destroy the Two-Face personality. In Batman: Two-Face Strikes Twice!, Two-Face is at odds with his ex-wife Gilda Grace Dent, as he believes their marriage failed because he was unable to give her children. She later marries Paul Janus (a reference to the Roman god of doors, who had two faces). Two-Face attempts to frame Janus as a criminal by kidnapping him and replacing him with a stand-in, whom Two-Face "disfigures" with makeup. Batman eventually catches Two-Face, and Gilda and Janus reunite. Years later, Gilda gives birth to twins, prompting Two-Face to escape once more and take the twins hostage, as he erroneously believes them to be conceived by Janus using an experimental fertility drug. The end of the book reveals that Two-Face is the twins' natural father.

Batman: Hush
In the Batman: Hush storyline, Dent's face is repaired by plastic surgery, seemingly eradicating the Two-Face personality. Dent takes the law into his own hands twice: once by using his ability to manipulate the legal system to free the Joker, and then again by shooting the serial killer Hush. He manipulates the courts into setting him free, as Gotham's prosecutors would not attempt to charge him without a body.

Return to villainy
In the Batman story arc Batman: Face the Face, that started in Detective Comics #817, and was part of DC's One Year Later storyline, it is revealed that, at Batman's request and with his training, Harvey Dent becomes a vigilante protector of Gotham City in most of Batman's absence of nearly a year. He is reluctant to take the job, but Batman assures him that it will serve as atonement for his past crimes. After a month of training, they fight the Firebug and Mr. Freeze, before Batman leaves for a year. Dent enjoys his new role, but his methods are more extreme and less refined than Batman's. Upon Batman's return, Dent begins to feel unnecessary and unappreciated, which prompts the return of the "Two-Face" persona (seen and heard by Dent through hallucinations). In Face the Face, his frustration is compounded by a series of mysterious murders that seem to have been committed by Two-Face; the villains KGBeast, Magpie, Ventriloquist and Scarface, and Orca are all shot twice in the head with a double-barreled pistol. When Batman confronts Dent about these deaths, asking him to confirm that he was not responsible, Dent refuses to give a definite answer. He then detonates a bomb in his apartment and leaves Batman dazed as he flees. Despite escaping the explosion physically unscathed, Dent suffers a crisis of conscience and a mental battle with his "Two-Face" personality. Although Batman later uncovers evidence that exonerates Dent for the murders, establishing that he was framed as revenge for his efforts against new crime boss Warren White, a.k.a. the Great White Shark, it is too late to save him. Prompted by resentment and a paranoid reaction to Batman's questioning, Dent scars half his face with nitric acid and a scalpel, becoming Two-Face once again. Blaming Batman for his return, Two-Face immediately goes on a rampage, threatening to destroy the Gotham Zoo (having retained two of every animal—including two humans) before escaping to fight Batman another day. Batman subsequently confronts White, while acknowledging that he cannot attack White, as there is no explicit evidence supporting Batman's deductions, vowing to inform Two-Face of White's actions when they next face each other.

On the cover of Justice League of America (vol. 2) #23, Two-Face is shown as a member of the new Injustice League. He can be seen in Salvation Run. He appears in Battle for the Cowl: The Underground, which shows the effects of Batman's death on his enemies. In Judd Winick's Long Shadow arc, Two-Face realizes that someone else has taken over as Batman. He hires a teleporter and manages to infiltrate the Batcave. When the new Batman investigates the cave, Two-Face ambushes him with tranquilizer darts, and in a hallucination he sees Dent in a red and black Two-Face themed Batman costume. Alfred Pennyworth saves the hero from Two-Face's torture after subduing his accomplice, and with his help Batman convinces Two-Face that he is the real, original Dark Knight, informing Dent that his problem is that he cannot imagine Batman changing because he himself is incapable of seeing the world in anything other than black and white. In Streets of Gotham, Two-Face has been at odds with Gotham's latest district attorney, Kate Spencer, also known as the vigilante Manhunter. Two-Face has recently been driven out of Gotham City by Jeremiah Arkham.

The New 52
In September 2011, The New 52 rebooted DC's continuity. Here, Two Face's origin is revised significantly. Harvey Dent is a successful defense attorney whose clientele includes twin sisters from the McKillen crime family, Shannon and Erin. The sisters coerce Dent to become their family's legal retainer for life. They then place a contract on James Gordon and his entire family, despite Dent's protestations. The Gordons survive the attempt on their lives, but Dent, bound by attorney-client confidentiality, is unable to dissuade the McKillens from continuing their lethal vendetta. The violent attempt on the Gordons' lives prompts Bruce Wayne to initiate and fund Dent's campaign for district attorney. Dent becomes D.A. and has the McKillen sisters prosecuted and sentenced to life in prison. After Shannon commits suicide, Erin escapes by switching places with her sister's corpse. Blaming Dent for her sister's death, Erin breaks into Dent's house, kills Gilda in front of him, and pours acid on his face, transforming him into Two-Face. Several years later, Erin McKillen returns to Gotham City to kill Two-Face, and thus reassert her control of her family's criminal operations. Her return sparks a climactic battle between her, Two-Face, and Batman. Two-Face scars McKillen with the same acid she used on him, but Batman stops him from killing her. Batman and Two-Face continue battling, with Batman trying to convince his foe to end his vendetta. Two-Face then calls Batman, "Bruce", revealing that he knows Batman's secret identity. Two-Face reveals that he struggled internally for quite some time over whether to kill his former friend, but decided not to because it would have violated his sense of justice. He disappears after the battle and Batman is unable to track him.

Several panels of Batman and Robin #28 imply that Two-Face commits suicide by shooting himself in the head.

DC Rebirth
In 2016, DC Comics implemented another relaunch of its books called "DC Rebirth", which restored its continuity to a form much as it was prior to "The New 52". Batman decides to cure Two-Face, doing whatever it takes. Following a confrontation with Two-Face and his henchmen - Killer Moth, Firefly, and Black Spider - Batman takes Two-Face into his custody, until they both have to fight KGBeast. They defeat KGBeast, but are badly injured. Batman nurses Two-Face back to health, but Two-Face suspects Batman of trying to betray him and rubs acid in his eyes. Two-Face and Batman mend their relationship somewhat in order to fight KGBeast, the Penguin, and Black Mask. Batman tells Two-Face that he can cure Two-Face's split personality. Two-Face does not trust Batman to help him, however, and so threatens to destroy Gotham City with poison gas unless Batman gives him the cure. In the end, Batman injects Two-Face with the "cure", which turns out to be a sedative that renders Two-Face unconscious. Batman then takes Two-Face back to Arkham.

In the Deface the Face story arc, Two Face goes to Batman for help. Harvey Dent had murdered a man whom he could not convict in trial. Two Face says, "...Harvey's the good one. He has to be. Otherwise, What am I?", and then decides to help Batman and Gordon bring down the terrorist group Kobra. In the Watchmen sequel Doomsday Clock, Two-Face is among the villains who attend the underground meeting held by the Riddler. In Harley Quinn: Rebirth, while Harley Quinn's Gang of Harleys is trying to find information about Man-Bat, they run into Two-Face in Arkham Asylum, where he makes threats towards the group.

Other characters named Two-Face

Wilkins
The first impostor was Wilkins, Harvey Dent's butler who uses makeup to suggest that Dent had suffered a relapse and disfigured his own face. This would give Wilkins the cover to commit crimes as Two-Face.

Paul Sloane
Paul Sloane becomes the second impostor of Two-Face. An actor, Sloane is disfigured by an accident on the set of a biography film about Two-Face. This occurred when a prop boy working on the film got jealous at the fact that his girlfriend developed a crush on Sloane. This causes the prop man to switch out the water with actual acid that was to be used for the trial scene. Sloane's mind snaps and he begins to think that he is Dent. Sloane recovers some of his own personality, but continues to commit crimes as Two-Face. Batman eventually confronted Sloane and managed to trick the criminal to undergo a reconstructive surgery which would cure his mental illness. Sloane is reused in later Earth-Two specific stories as Two-Face II of Earth-Two where the original Earth-Two Two-Face remains healed. Sloane is revived in the current continuity as a successor Two-Face, though not replacing Dent as done in the earlier Earth-Two specific storyline.

After the Crisis on Infinite Earths event, the Paul Sloane character, with a near-identical history to the Pre-Crisis version, appears in Detective Comics #580-581. In Double Image, Harvey Dent (as Two-Face) employs the Crime Doctor to re-disfigure Sloane. Dent does this out of jealous bitterness and the hope that Sloane would commit crimes based on the number two, thus confusing Batman. At the end of the story, Sloane is once again healed physically and mentally.

Paul Sloane is introduced into Post-Zero Hour continuity as a criminal called the Charlatan in Detective Comics #777 (February 2003). In this incarnation, Sloan (now spelled without a silent e) is an actor who had been hired by Joker, Penguin, Riddler, Mad Hatter, Scarecrow, and Killer Moth to take Two-Face's place in a scheme to kill Batman. They had originally offered Two-Face the part in the scheme, but his coin landed on the non-scarred side. During his impersonation of Two-Face, Batman discovered that this Two-Face was an impostor when he killed a security guard without consulting the coin. When the real Two-Face learns about this, he captures Sloan and disfigures his face. Scarecrow then experiments on him with fear toxins. Driven insane and deprived of fear, Charlatan becomes obsessed with both getting revenge on the criminals who hired him and completing his mission to kill Batman. Charlatan is defeated by Batman and incarcerated at Arkham Asylum.

George Blake
The third impostor of Two-Face is petty criminal George Blake who passed himself off as a manager of an anti-crime exhibition. However, he is not actually disfigured, but is wearing make-up. Furthermore, his makeup is worn on the opposite side of his face to Harvey Dent or Paul Sloane, which easily enabled Batman to identify him as an impostor. Batman defeats George Blake and clears Harvey Dent's name.

Batman as Two-Face
Also noteworthy is a 1968 story where Batman himself is temporarily turned into Two-Face via a potion.

Two-Face-Two
In Batman #700, which establishes Terry McGinnis as part of the DC Universe canon, it is revealed that Two-Face-Two kidnapped the infant Terry, along with an 80-year-old Carter Nichols, and tried to disfigure them in the style of the Joker. His plans were foiled by Damian Wayne, the fourth Robin and Batman's biological son. Unlike the original Two-Face, this version of the character was born deformed with a second face rather than being scarred by acid or fire and flips two coins instead of one. He is then killed when a machine falls on him. Another Two-Face-Two is briefly mentioned during the course of the DC One Million storyline, when the Batman of the 853rd century comments how this villain was defeated when the second Batman convinced him that the law of averages proved his coin-tossing would ultimately cause him to make more "good" decisions than "bad" ones.

Alternative versions
A number of alternate universes in DC Comics publications allow writers to introduce variations on Two-Face, in which the character's origins, behavior, and morality differ from the mainstream setting.

The Dark Knight Returns
In the alternate future setting of The Dark Knight Returns, plastic surgery returns Dent's face to normal, but at the unforeseen cost of permanently destroying the good-hearted Harvey Dent personality. The monstrous Two-Face is left in permanent control—to the extent that one of his henchmen now refers to him only as "Face". Now with his face swathed in bandages, he attempts to blow up the Gotham Twin Towers in exchange for ransom, but is stopped by Batman. He now sees both sides of his face as scarred, or as he says to Batman when he captures him, "At least both sides match". Later in the series, his psychiatrist (who is characterized as completely inept) describes Dent's condition as "recovering steadily".

Batman Black and White
Two-Face has a brief short story in the first issue of Batman Black and White, in the comic titled "Two of a Kind" featuring him receiving plastic surgery to regain his original identity as Harvey Dent, only to suffer a relapse when his fiancée – his former psychiatrist – is revealed to have a psychotic twin sister, who kills her sister and forces him to become Two-Face again in order to take his revenge.

Elseworlds
 In the Gotham by Gaslight timeline, he was responsible for dealing with the case against Bruce Wayne, who was framed for being Jack the Ripper. After a successful case, Harvey and Bruce's friendship was destroyed. During Convergence, this Dent was stationed on Telos. Harvey Dent, at this point having been scarred on half his face and become the villain Double Man, as well as other members of Batman's Victorian rogues gallery, were summoned by Mister Atom of Earth-S to battle Captain Marvel and the Marvel Family.
 In the Elseworlds story Batman: In Darkest Knight, Harvey Dent is the Gotham District Attorney and distrusts Green Lantern (who in this reality is Bruce Wayne) because of his vigilante tactics, made even worse due to Commissioner Gordon's distrust of Lantern due to his sheer power. Sinestro, after becoming deranged from absorbing Joe Chill's mind, then scars Dent's face and gives him powers similar to those of the main continuity's Evil Star. He calls himself Binary Star and works with Star Sapphire (who in this reality is Selina Kyle).
 In The Doom That Came To Gotham, an Elseworlds story based on "The Doom That Came To Sarnath", At The Mountains Of Madness and the overall works of H. P. Lovecraft, Harvey Dent is hideously mutated on the right side of his body by Talia al Ghul, and used as a conduit for a ritual intended to resurrect her father, the ancient sorcerer Ra's al Ghul, to bring about the end of Gotham City and the world. He is euthanized by Batman by the end of the story.
 Two-Face also appears in the Elseworlds Daredevil/Batman: Eye for an Eye crossover book, partnered with Marvel villain Mr. Hyde for the purpose of using Hyde as an "incubator" to grow an organic microchip, giving Hyde drugs to speed up this process (regardless of the fact that this would kill him). It is also revealed in this book that Harvey Dent had once been friends with Matt Murdock, who is secretly Daredevil. Prior to his disfigurement, Dent believed in giving criminals a chance at rehabilitation, while Murdock believed in final justice; having reversed his outlook to what Dent had once believed, Murdock talks Two-Face out of killing Hyde without Two-Face using his coin. Two-Face, however, insists that that act is merely "the last of Harvey Dent".
 In the Elseworlds story Batman: Masque, a pastiche of The Phantom of the Opera, Dent takes the role of the Phantom, as a former dancer who is disfigured after he sustains a serious burn to the left side when he was caught in the middle of a confrontation between Batman and a criminal.
 In the Elseworlds book Batman: Crimson Mist, the third part of the trilogy that began with Batman & Dracula: Red Rain, in which Batman becomes a vampire, Two-Face, having only recently been disfigured, forms a new gang accompanied by Killer Croc as his muscle and forges an alliance with Commissioner Gordon and Alfred Pennyworth to stop Batman when his insane thirst for blood drives him to kill his old enemies. After Batman is believed killed in the old Batcave, Two-Face turns on the two men, forcing Alfred to flee and rescue Batman while Gordon kills Two-Face's men. As he confronts Gordon, Two-Face is interrupted by Batman, restored to life after Alfred sacrificed himself so that his blood could restore his master. Batman drives two crossbow bolts into each side of Two-Face's head – "One for each face".
 In the Elseworlds story Batman/Tarzan: Claws of the Cat-woman, explorer and adventurer Finnegan Dent is revealed to be stealing the sacred artifacts of an African tribe in the lost city of Mnemnom. He is opposed in this effort by Batman and Tarzan. Tarzan was visiting Gotham to attend to business and joined forces with Batman as the two learnt about Dent's true agenda. As they try to stop Dent raiding the city further, half of Dent's face is mauled by a lion friend of Tarzan's, prompting him to decide to remain in Mnemnom and establish himself as its ruler on the grounds that modern society would have no place for a man with half a face. He is last seen being sealed away in a tomb of the rulers of Mnemnom after he triggers an explosion in a fight with Tarzan and Batman, Tarzan informing Dent as he takes the unconscious Batman to safety that taking Dent back to Gotham to face trial is Batman's idea of justice rather than his. Tarzan later tells Batman that Dent died when the falling rubble that knocked Batman unconscious crushed him.
 In the Elseworlds story Batman: Two Faces, Two-Face is depicted in the Victorian era, opposed by his friend Bruce Wayne after Bruce uses a potion on himself that he devised to try and cure Two-Face's split personality. Wayne's serum allows him to act as a superhuman Batman, but he eventually learns that the potion has also given him a split personality in the form of a ruthless murderer known as the Joker. When Bruce realizes the truth about his new state, he delivers a confession to Gordon and Two-Face before allowing himself to die as he transforms into the Joker once again, Dent taking Wayne's perfected serum to stabilize his mental state and allow him to act as the new Batman.
 In the Elseworlds story Catwoman: Guardian of Gotham, model Darcy Dent has half her face scarred when a rival model hires a hitman to lace her facial cream with acid. Unlike the regular Two-Face, Darcy does not rely on a coin toss to make her decisions, nor does she suffer from any type of personality disorder. Her motive is simply revenge against those responsible for her disfigurement, and her motif is mutilating her victims' faces and wearing a half business suit with a spiked metal bikini.

Thrillkiller
In the Batman: Thrillkiller universe, there are two versions of Two-Face. One is Detective Duell, a corrupt officer on the Gotham City Police Department, whose face is scarred in a manner similar to the version of Two-Face in the mainstream continuity. Duell is arrested at the end of Batgirl and Robin: Thrillkiller #1-3. In the sequel, Batgirl and Batman: Thrillkiller '62, Harvey Dent is the new District Attorney. He appears at the end as the new Mayor of Gotham.

Earth-Three
The new Earth-Three features a heroic female counterpart to Two-Face: Evelyn "Eve" Dent—"Three-Face"—the mother of Duela Dent (a nod to the classic film, The Three Faces of Eve). Her original affiliation is to the heroic Riddler Family (like the similar Batman Family); it included herself, Quizmaster, Jokester, and Riddler's/Joker's Daughter (her daughter Duela). They were later part of Alexander Luthor's Justice Underground, opposing Ultraman's Crime Syndicate.

Evelyn has three personalities (Irrational, Practical, and Hedonistic). To portray this, she wears a costume that is divided in three parts. Her right side favors loud fabrics like polka-dots, stripes, or plaids; her left side favors animal prints like tiger or leopard; and the center is a wide stripe of green. Over her leotard she wears a leather jacket that is a brown bomber jacket on the right and a black biker jacket on the left. Her face is not scarred but is instead usually painted all white with a vertical green center stripe and dark green or black lipstick; sometimes she is shown with her face parted into light green on the right, white in the middle, and mauve on the left. Her black hair is divided into cropped short on the right (sometimes dyed pink or red), worn shoulder-length on the left, and a mohawk in the center. She carries a revolver in a holster slung on her right hip.
	
She later has a cybernetic left arm after Superwoman mutilates her and leaves her for dead.

Gotham by Gaslight
In Gotham by Gaslight, Two-Face is a serial killer called "The Double Man", as mentioned in Countdown: Arena.

Tangent Comics
On the Tangent Earth, Harvey Dent is an African-American man with psionic powers and is that world's Superman, although he has no other similarities to the Two-Face character.

Flashpoint
In the Flashpoint alternate timeline, Harvey Dent is a judge. When Joker kidnaps Dent's children, Dent asks Batman for help in their search, agreeing to do anything asked. Dent warns Batman that he will shut down everything Batman owns, including Wayne Casinos, unless his children are saved.

The Batman Adventures
In The Batman Adventures, which is set in the continuity of Batman: The Animated Series, Two-Face is on the verge of being cured when the Joker convinces him that his fiancée, Grace Lamont, is cheating on him with Bruce Wayne. His evil personality takes hold once again, and he kidnaps Grace. Batman and Robin foil his plan and send him back to Arkham. Grace, meanwhile, realizes that Dent will never be cured and leaves him.

In another issue, Two-Face's life is thrown into chaos when he loses his coin during an unplanned breakout from Arkham and replaces it with a quarter. Little Jonni Infantino, the mastermind behind the breakout, threatens to hurt Grace if Two-Face doesn't provide information on one of Rupert Thorne's thugs: Weird Tony Hendra, one of Harvey Dent's last cases as District Attorney. Two-Face runs into a pay phone and warns Grace to get out of her apartment before Infantino can get to her. Later on, Grace is seen crying at a Chinese restaurant, calling Bruce Wayne to tell him that Dent saved her life; it is implied that Grace still loves him. Batman and Robin overpower Infantino and his gang, but Two-Face tries to kill him anyway.

In the story "Lucky Day", Two-Face and his gang take a game show hostage to get revenge on one of the contestants – Lester Dent, his father; Two-Face indicates Lester is a gambling addict who brutalized him and Harvey's mother whenever he lost.

According to Ty Templeton, series writer Dan Slott had many ideas for Two-Face's stories for the series, but the series was canceled before many of these ideas could be made.

Batman: Earth One

In the graphic novel Batman: Earth One, Harvey Dent has a twin sister named Jessica, who was a friend of Bruce Wayne from preparatory school. Harvey Dent occasionally would bully Bruce, as his maternal family (Arkhams rather than Kanes) had a reputation of eventually going insane. This led to the two boys having a fight at least once. After the twins reach adulthood, Harvey becomes Gotham City's District Attorney, and Jessica was the president of the city's board of supervisors. They are also political enemies of Gotham's corrupt mayor Oswald Cobblepot.  Jessica takes over Cobblepot's term as mayor following his confrontation with Batman, which resulted in Cobblepot's death and most of his crimes being posthumously outed.

In Volume Two, Jessica discovers that Bruce is Batman, and they each reciprocate the romantic affection they had for each other since childhood. However, after Sal Maroni kills Harvey, Jessica is disfigured following the incident when she presses her face against Harvey's burning, her final exchange with Bruce suggesting that she has developed a split personality with her brother as the other identity.

In Volume Three, Jessica's new split-personality manifests as a hallucination of Harvey as the 'traditional' Two-Face, driving her to trigger a gang war.

Batman Beyond
In the Batman Beyond universe, Two-Face is revealed to be reformed into Harvey Dent again. Though not a district attorney again due to his terms being already ended, he helped the city set up a law preventing deceased villains to have public graves in order to prevent martyrdom, including hiding their corpses from the public eye.

Injustice: Gods Among Us
In the Injustice: Gods Among Us prequel comic, Two-Face crashes a live broadcast on a Gotham news channel, having murdered a guest speaker and taken his place. His obsession with duality appealed to by the recent actions of Superman due to the destruction of Metropolis and with half the nation in favor of his recent actions and the other not, Two-Face himself admits, "I couldn't stay away. I tried. But the coin...". Two-Face flips his signature coin to decide which of the anchors he will kill when the coin is vaporized by a blast of Superman's heat vision before it has a chance to land in his hand. Shocked, infuriated and at a loss, Two-Face brandishes his gun at the Man of Steel but the weapon is easily destroyed. Two-Face is then subdued by the news station's security guards and he is last seen back in Arkham Asylum in a straitjacket when Batman and Nightwing confront Superman, Wonder Woman, Cyborg and Robin. While still bound and restrained, Two-Face witnesses the heroes arguing and attempts to attack Robin during Harley Quinn's riot, but is knocked out by one of Green Arrow's boxing arrows.

DC Comics Bombshells
In an alternate history set in 1941, issue 13 of the DC Comics Bombshells comic depicts Harvey Dent as the newly elected mayor of Gotham City. Despite having been elected on a platform of supporting World War II refugees from Europe, he becomes an anti-immigrant isolationist in office, who vows to crack down on vigilantes under the slogan "Make Gotham Golden Once More". Tim Drake acknowledges this as a "heavy-handed-but-uncomfortably-timely political allegory" of Donald Trump, whom Dent is drawn to resemble. During the issue, it is revealed that Dent's change is due to him being mind controlled by Hugo Strange, and Dent is freed from the professor's influence at the end. After Dent was saved, he dedicated himself to aiding the Batgirls in their cause. During a battle between Killer Frost and the Reaper, Harvey saves Alyssa Yeoh and Nell Little from one of Killer Frost's blasts, causing half of his face to get frozen and blackened from severe frostbite. Harvey's facial damage doesn't drive him insane, as the Batgirls remind him that since he got it from risking his life to save them, it shows that he's more whole than two-faced. He is seen in their lair serving as their butler similar to Alfred Pennyworth.

Batman '66
Two-Face appeared in "The Lost Episode" of Batman '66.

Batman/Teenage Mutant Ninja Turtles
In Batman/Teenage Mutant Ninja Turtles crossover, Two-Face is mutated into a mutant baboon as one of the various other Arkham inmates by Shredder and Foot Clan to attack Batman and Robin. Batman is captured, but Robin manages to escape. The Ninja Turtles and Splinter then arrive, where Splinter defeats the mutated villains, while Batman uses his new Intimidator Armor to defeat Shredder and the Turtles defeat Ra's al Ghul. Later, Gordon tells Batman that the police scientists have managed to turn Two-Face and the rest of the mutated inmates at Arkham back to normal and are currently in A.R.G.U.S. custody.

Emperor Joker
In the "Emperor Joker" storyline, when the Joker stole the reality warping power of Mister Mxyzptlk, he warped reality in his own image. Here, Two-Face was a small plushie-like creature that was a servant of Harley Quinn. He had a penchant for double entendres, such as quipping to the reader "If you think I'm small, you should see my silver dollar!"

Thy Kingdom Come
In Thy Kingdom Come storyline, when Power Girl was briefly transferred to another version of the pre-Crisis Earth-2 by Gog, she learned that the Joker of this world once attempted to deal with the aging and 'retirement' of Batman's old Rogue's Gallery by repeating the events of Two-Face's creation, attacking new District Attorney Harvey Sims to create a new Two-Face just as he was proposing to Helena Wayne, only for the Joker's attack to leave Sims disfigured and confined to the hospital rather than driving him insane.

Batman: White Knight
Two-Face has a minor appearance in the 2017 series Batman: White Knight. Dent, along with several other Batman villains, is tricked by Jack Napier (who in this reality was a Joker who had been force fed an overdose of pills by Batman which temporarily cured him of his insanity) into drinking drinks that had been laced with particles from Clayface's body. This was done so that Napier, who was using Mad Hatter’s technology to control Clayface, could control them by way of Clayface's ability to control parts of his body that had been separated from him. Dent and the other villains are then used to attack a library which Napier himself was instrumental in building in one of Gotham City’s poorer districts. Later on in the story, the control hat is stolen by Neo-Joker (the second Harley Quinn, who felt that Jack Napier was a pathetic abnormality while Joker was the true, beautiful personality), in an effort to get Napier into releasing the Joker persona. Two-Face also appears in the sequel storyline Batman: Curse of the White Knight, being among the villains murdered by Azrael.

In other media

See also
 List of Batman Family enemies
 Batman: The Long Halloween
 Batman: Dark Victory
 Gilda Dent

Notes

References

Sources

External links

Two-Face at DC Comics' official website
Two-Face at the DC Database Project
 

Batman characters
Characters created by Bob Kane
Coin flipping
Comics characters introduced in 1942
Fictional bank robbers
Fictional characters with disfigurements
Fictional characters with dissociative identity disorder
Fictional crime bosses
Fictional district attorneys
Fictional marksmen and snipers
Fictional mass murderers
Fictional rampage and spree killers
Golden Age supervillains
DC Comics male supervillains
Fictional victims of domestic abuse
Fictional suicides
Fictional attempted suicides
Fictional blackmailers
Fictional cult leaders
Vigilante characters in comics
Fictional_prison_escapees